Buonocore is an Italian surname. Notable people with the surname include:

Alfonso Buonocore (born 1933), Italian swimmer and water polo player
Carmelo Buonocore (1912–1982), Italian footballer
Fabrizio Buonocore (born 1977), Italian water polo player
Giovanni Battista Buonocore (1643–1699), Italian Baroque painter
Louis T. Buonocore, American criminal (securities fraud)
Nino Buonocore (born 1958), Italian singer-songwriter
Pasquale Buonocore (1916–2003), Italian water polo player

References

Italian-language surnames